The 2018 Gazipur City Corporation election was an election in Gazipur, Bangladesh, held on 27 June 2018 to elect the 2nd Mayor of Gazipur. Zahangir Alam elected as second mayor of the Gazipur City Corporation in July 2018.

Results

Reference 

Gazipur
Gazipur City Corporation
Local elections in Bangladesh